Akari Shiraki (born 4 November 1996) is a Japanese professional footballer who plays as a forward for WE League club MyNavi Sendai.

Club career 
Shiraki made her WE League debut on 12 September 2021.

References 

Living people
1996 births
Japanese women's footballers
Women's association football forwards
Association football people from Hokkaido
Mynavi Vegalta Sendai Ladies players
WE League players